Abu al-Fadhl Imāmuddīn Khān Barāwli Chhachhrī (commonly known as Imamuddin Punjabi) (died 1916) was an Indian Sunni Muslim scholar who established the Jamia Miftahul Uloom.

Family background
Imāmuddīn Punjabi's predecessors hailed from the area of Brawl, Bajaur. They had relocated to Chhachh, and then finally settled in the Kāla Noor area of Batala in Punjab.

Biography
Imāmuddīn Punjabi was born in Batala, a city now in the Indian state of Punjab. He studied ahādith with Ahmad Ali Saharanpuri and graduated in the traditional dars-e-nizami from Darul Uloom Deoband. After completing his studies from the Deoband seminary, Punjabi pledged allegiance to Fazle Rahmān Ganj Murādābādi in Sufism.

Punjabi moved to Maunath Bhanjan in 1298 AH. He established Jamia Miftahul Uloom, a known seminary in the Indian state of Uttar Pradesh.

Punjabi died in 1916 in Mau in the United Provinces of Agra and Oudh.

Literary works
Books include:
 al-Balāgh al-Mubīn
 Tab'yīn al-Kalām fi daf' il-Khisām
 Masābīh al-Itlā ala al-Tahrīm al-Tawājud wa al-Simā
 Rabī al-Anwār
 Eīdayn ki namāz ka waqt

Bibliography

References

1916 deaths
Indian Sunni Muslims
People from Mau
Darul Uloom Deoband alumni
Deobandis